Reza Bigdeloo (born 15 November 2000) is an Iranian footballer who played for Sabah in the Azerbaijan Premier League. He primarily plays as a forward.

Club career

Early years
Reza Bigdeloo began his amateur career at the academy of local clubs in Marand County, East Azerbaijan Province.

In early 2019, he transferred to the youth academy "Sabah". He scored his debut goal in the Azerbaijan First Division on February 28, 2019, in the match against Keshla II.

Sabah Baku
Reza Bigdeloo was invited to the main squad due to his successful performance in the First Division. On April 19, 2019, Reza Bigdeloo made his professional debut in the Premier League in the 83rd minute of the match against Neftchi Baku.

On May 11, 2019, Reza played a 90-minute match against Zira in the Premier League.

Personal life
He is the first football player in Iran to have an NFT.

References

2000 births
People from Tehran
Living people
Association football forwards
Iran international footballers
Sabah FC (Azerbaijan) players
Azerbaijan Premier League players
Association football players not categorized by nationality